Tang-e Kureh-ye Olya (also Romanized as Tang-e Kūreh-ye ʿOlyā) is a village in Zalaqi-ye Sharqi Rural District, Besharat District, Aligudarz County, Lorestan Province, Iran. At the 2006 census, its population was 64, in 15 families.

References 

Towns and villages in Aligudarz County